Hjalmar "Hjallen" Andresen (18 July 1914 – 22 June 1982) was a Norwegian football forward. He played for Norway in the 1938 FIFA World Cup. He was capped six times. On the club level he played for Sarpsborg FK. He died in June 1982 and was buried in Tune.

References

1914 births
1982 deaths
People from Sarpsborg
Norwegian footballers
Sarpsborg FK players
Norway international footballers
1938 FIFA World Cup players
Association football forwards
Sportspeople from Viken (county)